Sphaerosacme is a monotypic genus of plants in the family Meliaceae. The sole species is Sphaerosacme decandra, a dioecious tree with odd-pinnate leaves. No subspecies are listed in the Catalogue of Life.  Its distribution includes: Nepal, North Andamans, Bhutan, India (West Bengal, Darjeeling, Sikkim) and Myanmar [Burma] (Kachin).

References

Meliaceae
Trees of the Indian subcontinent
Flora of the Andaman Islands
Trees of Myanmar
Monotypic Sapindales genera
Meliaceae genera
Dioecious plants